Felicity Okpete Ovai (born 1961) is an engineer and academic from Degema, Rivers State in Nigeria. A member of the Rivers State People's Democratic Party, she was the first woman to be appointed Commissioner of Works, serving from 2003 to 2006.

Education
Ovai completed her secondary education at Holy Rosary Secondary School (now Holy Rosary College) in Port Harcourt. She received a B.Tech in
Agricultural Engineering from the Rivers State University of Science and Technology and a Master of Mechanical
Engineering degree from the University of Port Harcourt.

Career
Ovai has held various positions of responsibility in Rivers State. She served as first woman Commissioner of Works in the Executive Council of Rivers State from 2003 to 2006. While in office, she oversaw the commencement of a number of road construction projects in the state including work on the road connecting Ogoni, Andoni, and Opobo–Nkoro generally christened Unity Road which totaled about ₦11.8 billion.

On 2 December 2006, it was reported that Okpete Ovai alongside Shedrack Akalokwu, a Special Adviser to Governor Peter Odili and Wilson Ake, a member of House of the Representatives had been cleared by the People's Democratic Party to participate in its Rivers West senatorial primary election.

In February 2016, Ovai was appointed a member of the Rivers State Roads Maintenance and Rehabilitation Agency by Governor Ezenwo Nyesom Wike. She is also a member of various professional bodies, such as Nigeria Society of Engineers, Institute of Mechanical Engineers and Society of Agricultural Engineers.

See also
List of people from Rivers State
Government of Rivers State

References

1961 births
Living people
People from Degema
Holy Rosary College alumni
Rivers State University alumni
Engineers from Rivers State
Rivers State Peoples Democratic Party politicians
Rivers State Commissioners of Works
Nigerian women engineers
Nigerian women academics
Nigerian Christians
University of Port Harcourt alumni
Women government ministers of Nigeria
21st-century women engineers